Digvijay Narayan Chaubey (also known as Jay Chaubey) is an Indian politician and a member of 17th Legislative Assembly of Uttar Pradesh of India. He represents the Khalilabad (Assembly constituency) in Sant Kabir Nagar district of Uttar Pradesh, India and is a member of the Samajwadi Party.

Early life and education
Chaubey was born 15 October 1970 in Bhitaha village in Sant Kabir Nagar district of Uttar Pradesh to father Gomti Prasad Chaturvedi. In 1994, he married Poonam Chaturvedi, they have two sons named Satyam and Shivam and one daughter Smriti. He belongs to Brahmin family. He earned Diploma in Computer science degree from Karnataka and Bachelor of Education degree from Bangalore.

Political career
Chaubey started his journey of politics in 16th Legislative Assembly of Uttar Pradesh (2012) elections, he got ticket by Bharatiya Janata Party from Khalilabad (Assembly constituency). But he lost to Mohamed Ayub (Peace Party of India) and stood on third with 43,552 (21.06℅) votes.

In 17th Legislative Assembly of Uttar Pradesh (2017) elections, he again contested from Khalilabad and won this seat by defeating Bahujan Samaj Party candidate Mashhoor Alam Choudhary by a margin of 16,037 (7.16℅) votes.

Posts held

References

Uttar Pradesh MLAs 2017–2022
Bharatiya Janata Party politicians from Uttar Pradesh
Living people
People from Sant Kabir Nagar district
1970 births